The Anchorage Assembly is the governing body of Anchorage, Alaska. The Assembly has eleven members elected to three-year terms from six districts. It is responsible for creating and approving the city's annual budget, appropriating municipal funding, and managing elections. Seats in the Assembly are officially nonpartisan.

Current composition 
All 11 members are elected from districts known as sections. Five of the sections elect two members from designated seats, while the remaining section elects one member.

 : Member elected in a special election

Notable former members 

 Mark Begich, former U.S. senator and mayor of Anchorage
 Chris Birch, former member of the Alaska Legislature
 H. A. Boucher, 2nd lieutenant governor of Alaska
 Craig Campbell, 10th lieutenant governor of Alaska
 Matt Claman, member of the Alaska House of Representatives and former acting mayor of Anchorage
 Eric Croft, former member of the Alaska House of Representatives
 Harriet Drummond, member of the Alaska House of Representatives
 Fred Dyson, former member of the Alaska Legislature
 Elvi Gray-Jackson, member of the Alaska Senate
 Tony Knowles, 7th governor of Alaska and former mayor of Anchorage
 Anna MacKinnon, former member of the Alaska Legislature
 Kevin Meyer, 14th lieutenant governor of Alaska
 Pete Petersen, member of the Alaska House of Representatives
 Austin Quinn-Davidson, acting mayor of Anchorage
 Lidia Selkregg, Italian-American geologist and professor of regional planning
 Arliss Sturgulewski, former member of the Alaska Senate
 Dan Sullivan, former mayor of Anchorage
 Charles Wohlforth, author and journalist
 George Wuerch, former mayor of Anchorage

References

External links
 List of previous Assembly members

Government of Anchorage, Alaska
Government agencies with year of establishment missing
Local government in Alaska